Mladen Brkić (Serbian Cyrillic: Младен Бркић; born October 30, 1980) is a Serbian professional footballer who plays as a striker.

Club career

Apolonia Fier
Brkić presented himself in Albania for the first time in the 2008–09 season where he scored 9 goals in 30 matches with Apolonia Fier. He improved during the next season, scoring 15 goals in 30 matches, missing out "Golden Boot" to Daniel Xhafa for 3 goals. In January 2010 he was also named the new team captain.

Brkić was loaned out to Dinamo Tirana for the club's participation in the UEFA Europa League; he played in the first leg of first qualifying round against FC Lahti which ended 4–1 to the Finnish side.

Skënderbeu Korçë
On 14 August 2010, Brkić was signed by Skënderbeu Korçë on a one-year contract worth €50,000. He scored in a friendly just four days later against Pogradeci. Brkić scored his first Albanian Superliga hat-trick on 24 October 2010 in a 5–1 home win over Kastrioti Krujë in the matchday 8. The feat was followed by braces against Dinamo Tirana and Besa Kavajë which brought the striker tally to 7 goals. He finished the first part of the season as Skënderbeu to scorer with 8 goals in 16 appearances, in addition 1 goal in 1 cup appearance before leaving in January.

Dinamo Tirana (loan)
In January 2011 Brkić joined a half-season loan at Dinamo Tirana, returning at capital club after two-and-a-half years. As part of the transfer, Albanian midfielder Gjergji Muzaka went to the opposite direction.

Flamurtari Vlorë
Brkić agreed personal terms and joined fellow top flight side Flamurtari on 15 September 2011 on a one-year contract. His spell at Red&Blacks was short-lived, as he went goalless in 10 league appearances. He did, however, scored once in Albanian Cup on 28 September versus lower league opposition Bilisht Sport. He left the club in the first days of January after terminating the contract.

Zalaegerszegi TE
On 15 March 2012, after three months as a free agent, Brkić left Albania and joined Zalaegerszegi TE of Nemzeti Bajnokság I. He signed a contract until the end of the 2011–12 season and took squad number 11. Brkić made his competitive two days later by entering as a substitute in the final minutes of the 1–1 home draw against Szombathelyi Haladás. His first score-sheet contributions came in his second appearance for the club on 24 March against Vasas SC, netting a volley in 76th minute to give his team the temporary lead in an eventual 2–3 loss at Illovszky Rudolf Stadion. Brkić finished his short spell in Hungary by making 8 appearances and scoring once, as Zalaegerszegi TE was relegated to Nemzeti Bajnokság II after finishing last in the championship.

Laçi
Brkić completed a transfer to Albanian Superliga outfit Laçi on 29 August 2013, returning in Albania after two seasons. He made his debut on 14 September in the opening week of championship versus Partizani Tirana, producing a strong performance and assisted the lone goal before was replaced at extra time as Laçi won at home. He opened his scoring account later on 6 November in a cup match against Elbasani, netting the opener with a penalty kick as Laçi won 2–0. His first league goal came three days later as he scored the first of a 0–2 win at Kastrioti Krujë. He left the club on 14 April of the following year due to his poor performances throughout the season, having scored only 4 goals in 25 league appearances.

Career statistics

References

External links

AFA profile

1980 births
Living people
People from Zaječar
Serbian footballers
Association football forwards
OFK Mladenovac players
FK Timok players
FK Železnik players
FK Radnički Beograd players
FK Sevojno players
FK ČSK Čelarevo players
FK Sloga Kraljevo players
SV Gmunden players
KF Apolonia Fier players
KF Skënderbeu Korçë players
FK Dinamo Tirana players
Flamurtari Vlorë players
Zalaegerszegi TE players
Serbian expatriate footballers
Expatriate footballers in Austria
Expatriate footballers in Albania
Expatriate footballers in Hungary
Serbian expatriate sportspeople in Austria
Serbian expatriate sportspeople in Albania
Serbian expatriate sportspeople in Hungary